The Lives of Others is a 2006 German film directed by Florian Henckel von Donnersmarck.

The Lives of Others may also refer to:

 The Lives of Others (novel), a 2014 novel by Neel Mukherjee
 The Lives of Others, a 2021 album by You Am I